The Taça D. Carlos I was a friendly football tournament that was held only once, in Campo Alegre, Porto, on 2 March 1894. That match was contested by representative teams of Lisbon and Porto, and ended in a 1–0 win to the Lisbonenses, but most important than the result was its historical significance, as it was the first major football event in Portugal as well as the first football ‘cup’ played on the Iberian Peninsula. Moreover, the Taça D. Carlos I was the first domestic match between those two cities.

The cup was named in honor of the donator of the trophy, don Carlos I of Portugal, who attended the meeting together with his wife, Queen Amelia, as well as the princes D. Luís Filipe and D. Manuel, who were still boys at the time. This is possibly the first match in which extra-time was played as the royal couple arrived too late to see the first half and the Queen demanded that the game continued after the final whistle because she was enjoying it so much.

The meeting was held at the initiative of the then FC Porto president, António Nicolau de Almeida, but it was ultimately organized by the presidents of Oporto Cricket and Lawn Tennis Club and Club Lisbonense, Hugh Ponsonby and Guilherme Pinto Basto, who served as the captains of their respective sides in the match. Pinto Basto is widely regarded as the father of football in Portugal, and it was he who managed to have the King present, who traveled to Porto to witness the event and present a trophy to the winners. The patronage and sponsorship of the King were pivotal to attract a significant number of spectators, as football was practically an unknown sport in Portugal at the time. The game received international publicity, being publicized outside Portugal, and was even reported in the famous English magazine Illustrated Sporting and Dramatic News, which reported the game as a new "conquest" made by their beloved sport.

Background
On 25 October 1893, António Nicolau de Almeida, the founder and president of the recently established Futebol Clube do Porto, made an attempt to launch the club by writing a letter to the president of Club Lisbonense, Guilherme Pinto Basto, to invite them to a football match, scheduled for 2 November of the same year. Almeida's invitation was published four days later in the Diário Ilustrado, a Lisbon newspaper, printed on page 3 of the 29 October edition, together with the response from Pinto Basto, who accepts the invitation, but not on the scheduled day, because according to him, it would not be possible "to gather, choose the group and arrange the departure in such a short space of time".

In the midtime, however, Pinto Basto made the same invitation to Hugh Ponsonby, the then secretary of the Oporto Cricket and Lawn Tennis Club, who at the time also had his own football team due to its rapid growth in England, the homeland of the company's workers. Pinto Basto did this because, unlike FC Porto, the Oporto Cricket owned a football field, Campo Alegre. Ponsonby accepted Pinto Basto's invitation, and together they organized this meeting, which was held a few months later at Campo Alegre, between Club Lisbonense and Oporto Cricket. However, that honor has been wrongly attributed to FC Porto, who on the contrary of what has been widely believed throughout the years, had nothing to do with this game.

Pre-match
Convinced by Pinto Basto, his majesty the King D. Carlos gave his patronage to the match, offering a solid silver cup made by the jeweler of the Royal house, which become known as the Taça D. Carlos I, or even Cup d'El Rey, and had an inscription that said: Football Championship das Cidades de Portugal, thus creating a national cup based on the idea of the competition being held annually by "football teams from all the Portuguese cities". The cup would be played at the field of the last winner and the first team to win it three years in a row would keep the trophy permanently. However, only one edition was played, contested by one team from Porto, Oporto Cricket Club, and one from Lisbon, Club Lisbonense (the predecessor of CIF). Some sources state, incorrectly, that the Lisbon team was a mix of Club Lisbonense, Carcavelos Club and Braço de Prata.

Moreover, the King also requested for the match to be included in the official program of the commemorative celebrations of the Henriquino Centenary, organized in Porto, in memory of the infante, on 2 March 1894. Another Royal demand was: "at least six players from each representative team would have to be Portuguese, and the remaining five foreigners would have to live there for more than three months". This demand was apparently forgotten as both clubs failed to use six Portugueses, with Lisbon using four and Porto only two.

Overview
The Lisbon team went to Porto by train on a journey that took 14 hours. Three hours after landing, in Campanhã, the game was played on the field belonging to the Oporto Cricket and Lawn Tennis Club, in Campo Alegre. It was scheduled for three in the afternoon, but it started a quarter of an hour later. Admission was free and there were plenty of curious friends of the town's football players. Porto wore blue shirts and Lisbon wore cream-colored. The driving forces of this match, Guilherme Pinto Basto and Hugh Ponsonby, were also the captains of their respective sides. The game was refereed by Guilherme's brother, Eduardo.

D. Carlos, D. Amélia, and the princes only arrived towards the end of the match, and at the request of Her Majesty the Queen, the game continued for another 10 minutes because she was enjoying it so much, having previously established that it would not have any influence on the result of the match. Because of this, the 1894 Taça D. Carlos I is possibly the first match in which extra-time was played on the Iberian Peninsula, and maybe even one of the first to do so in continental Europe.

Club Lisbonense scored the only goal of the match, securing a 1–0 win, thus becoming the very first Portuguese club to win an official title. The name of the goal scorer does not appear in any chronicle, thus the author of this historic goal remains completely unknown. It is only known that the Vilar brothers (Afonso and Carlos), C.D. Rankin, and Arthur Paiva Raposo contributed to Lisbon's victory. The Cup that some still call Taça D. Carlos I was to be played every year, but it did not go beyond the first.

Final details

|valign="top" width="50%"|

|}

Note: At least six players from each team had to be Portuguese. The remaining five foreigners would have to live in Portugal for more than three months.

The trophy

The so-called "D. Carlos I trophy", which had been offered by the king himself, was nothing more than a simple silver cup, which was handed over to Guilherme Pinto Basto, the captain of the Lisbon team, who won the match. Pinto Basto kept it until the foundation of the CIF in 1902, when he handed it over to them. The trophy remained there as one of the most beautiful and important rarities in the history of Portuguese football.

Aftermath
The game also received international publicity, being publicized outside Portugal, and was even reported in the famous English magazine Illustrated Sporting & Dramatic News, which reported the game as a new "conquest" made by their beloved sport. Eight days after the match between FC Porto and FC Lisbonense, O Sport published the following note: "On Sunday, 11 March, some members of the Foot Ball Club do Porto were on the field of the old hippodrome of Matosinhos, training for two hours".

See also
Football in Portugal
First football match in Portugal

References

Sport in Porto
Sport in Portugal
1900s in Portuguese sport
1894 in association football
1894 in European football
March 1894 sports events
19th century in Portugal